is a facility located in Shibuya, Tokyo, owned by Shibuya Mark City company. There are two buildings, "East" (Hotel side) and "West" (Office side). It was built and opened on April 7, 2000, targeting mainly women, collaborating with Keio Corporation.

References

External links
Shibuya Mark City Official Site
Office Information

Buildings and structures in Shibuya
Service companies based in Tokyo
Retail companies based in Tokyo
Real estate companies based in Tokyo
Real estate companies established in 2000
Japanese companies established in 2000